Monkhopton is a civil parish in Shropshire, England.  It contains four listed buildings that are recorded in the National Heritage List for England.  Of these, two are at Grade II*, the middle of the three grades, and the others are at Grade II, the lowest grade.  The parish is almost entirely rural, and the listed buildings consist of a church, a monastic grange converted into a farmhouse, a former toll house, and a war memorial.
 

Key

Buildings

References

Citations

Sources

Lists of buildings and structures in Shropshire